Cona is a town and comune in the Metropolitan City of Venice, Veneto, northern Italy. It is west of SR516.

Sources
(Google Maps)

Cities and towns in Veneto